Rawnsley is a family name; it may refer to:

People
 Andrew Rawnsley (born 1962), British political journalist
 Brenda Rawnsley (1916-2007), British arts campaigner and arts education activist
 David Rawnsley (1909–1977), British art director
 Hardwicke Rawnsley (1851-1920), English clergyman, poet, writer of hymns and conservationist
 John Rawnsley (born 1950), English actor and opera singer
 Jimmy Rawnsley (1904-1965), English night fighter radar operator
 Kenneth Rawnsley (1926-1992), English psychiatrist
 Matthew Rawnsley (born 1976), English cricketer
 Willingham Franklin Rawnsley (1845?–1927), British author and school proprietor

Places
 Rawnsley, Staffordshire, village in England
 Rawnsley's Bluff, geological feature in Australia

Other
 Rawnsley's bowerbird, rare intergeneric hybrid between the satin bowerbird and regent bowerbird